Thomas Rimmer (born 6 September 1980 in Reading, Berkshire, England) is a New Zealand stage and screen actor best known for his role in Danny Mulheron's feature film directorial debut Fresh Meat. His television work includes roles in The Gibson Group's Facelift and Bryan Bruce's crime documentary series The Investigator.

In 2011, Thomas also wrote and performed in his solo show Writer's Block.

Filmography 
 Fresh Meat (film) (2012)
 Fundamental (2012)
 The Investigator (2011)
 My Living Memory (2011)
 The Insider's Guide To Love (2005)
 Facelift (TV series) (2004)

References

External links 

Official Site
Biography on Theatreview

Living people
1980 births
actors from Reading, Berkshire
English emigrants to New Zealand
New Zealand male television actors
New Zealand male film actors
21st-century New Zealand male actors
Male actors from Berkshire